Matveyevsky (masculine), Matveyevskaya (feminine), or Matveyevskoye (neuter) may refer to:
Matveyevsky District, a district of Orenburg Oblast, Russia
Matveyevsky (rural locality) (Matveyevskaya, Matveyevskoye), name of several rural localities in Russia